Minuartia pusilla is a species of flowering plant in the family Caryophyllaceae known by the common names annual sandwort and dwarf stitchwort.

It grows in mountain pine forests, chaparral, plains, and other habitats.

Description
Minuartia pusilla is a petite annual herb producing a slender, erect stem no more than 5 centimeters tall. The tiny green concave leaves are thready to lance-shaped, up to 5 millimeters long and no more than 1.5 millimeters wide.

The tiny flower has five pointed sepals just a few millimeters long. There may be five white petals which are roughly the same length as the sepals or slightly smaller, though sometimes the flowers lack petals.

External links
Jepson Manual Treatment: Minuartia pusilla
USDA Plants Profile
Flora of North America
Minuartia pusilla — U.C. Photo gallery

pusilla
Flora of California
Flora of Nevada
Flora of Oregon
Flora of Utah
Flora of Washington (state)
Flora of the Sierra Nevada (United States)
Natural history of the California chaparral and woodlands
Natural history of the California Coast Ranges
Natural history of the Peninsular Ranges
Natural history of the Transverse Ranges
Flora without expected TNC conservation status